Holasteron is a genus of spiders in the family Zodariidae. It was first described in 2004 by Baehr. , it contains 16 species, all from Australia.

Species
Holasteron comprises the following species:
 H. aciculare Baehr, 2004 (type) — Australia
 H. aspinosum Baehr, 2004 — Australia (Western Australia)
 H. driscolli Baehr, 2004 — Australia (New South Wales, South Australia)
 H. esperance Baehr, 2004 — Australia (Western Australia)
 H. flinders Baehr, 2004 — Australia (South Australia)
 H. hirsti Baehr, 2004 — Australia (South Australia)
 H. humphreysi Baehr, 2004 — Australia (South Australia)
 H. kangaroo Baehr, 2004 — Australia (South Australia)
 H. marliesae Baehr, 2004 — Australia (New South Wales)
 H. perth Baehr, 2004 — Australia (Western Australia)
 H. pusillum Baehr, 2004 — Australia (Western Australia, South Australia)
 H. quemuseum Baehr, 2004 — Australia (Queensland)
 H. reinholdae Baehr, 2004 — Australia (Western Australia)
 H. spinosum Baehr, 2004 — Australia (Western Australia, South Australia, Victoria)
 H. stirling Baehr, 2004 — Australia (Western Australia)
 H. wamuseum Baehr, 2004 — Australia (Western Australia)

References

Zodariidae
Araneomorphae genera
Spiders of Australia